María Libertad Gómez Garriga  (July 18, 1889 – July 7, 1961) was a Puerto Rican educator, community leader, and politician. She is one of the twelve women honored with a plaque in "La Plaza en Honor a la Mujer Puertorriqueña" (Plaza in Honor of Puerto Rican Women), in San Juan.

Early life
María Libertad Gómez Garriga was born in Arenas barrio of mountainous Utuado, the daughter of Francisco Esteban Gómez and Maria Jesusa Garriga. Francisco Esteban Gómez's grandfather Germán and great-grandmother Gregoria were born in slavery. She completed teacher training at the University of Puerto Rico in 1909.

Career
Gómez Garriga taught elementary school for several years; she was also trained as an accountant and active in rural labor organizations. She was director of a tobacco cooperative; in 1929, she and other activists founded a bank for women. In 1932, she was elected to a leadership position on the Puerto Rican Liberal Party, but soon her wing of the party split off to become the Popular Democratic Party (PPD). After several years working in politics, she was elected to the Puerto Rican House of Representatives in 1940, representing the district of Utuado. She worked particularly on education issues and civil rights, and was pro-independence. For one month in 1945, during a time of transition, she was President of the House, the first woman to hold that position. She was re-elected to her seat three times, and won her last election to the House of Representatives in 1952.  She was the only woman in the Constitutional Convention of Puerto Rico, formed in 1951, and the only woman to sign the 1952 Constitution.

She ran unsuccessfully for the Senate of Puerto Rico in 1956, and resigned her positions in the Popular Democratic party after that.

Personal life and legacy
Gómez died in 1961, aged 72 years. She is one of the twelve women honored with a plaque in the "Plaza en Honor a la Mujer Puertorriqueña" (Plaza in Honor of Puerto Rican Women) in San Juan. There is a public upper elementary school named for María Libertad Gómez Garriga in Utuado. There is also a middle school named for Gómez, in Toa Baja, Puerto Rico.

See also

List of Puerto Ricans
History of women in Puerto Rico

Notes

References

|-

External links
 José Luis Colón Gonzalez, ed., María Libertad Gómez: Mujer de Convicción, Líder de Cambios (Librería la Tertulia 2014).

1889 births
1961 deaths
People of Afro–Puerto Rican descent
People from Utuado, Puerto Rico
20th-century Puerto Rican educators
20th-century Puerto Rican politicians
Puerto Rican women
Puerto Rican women in politics
Speakers of the House of Representatives of Puerto Rico